Hoy cumple años mamá ( Today it's mom's birthday) is a 1948 Argentine comedy film, directed by Ignacio domínguez Riera and written by Roberto A. Tálice and Eliseo Montaine. It was premiered on July 14, 1948.

The film is about a widow who will wed with one of her daughter's pretenders.

Cast
 Olinda Bozán
 Fernando Cortés
 Rodolfo Onetto
 Inda Ledesma
 Carlos Enríquez
 Antonia Volpe
 Jacinto Aicardi
 Dedé Contestábile
 Agustín Barrios
 Gaby Guerrico
 Julio Durand
 Claudio Rodríguez Leiva

External links
 

1948 films
1940s Spanish-language films
Argentine black-and-white films
Argentine comedy films
1948 comedy films
1940s Argentine films